The Philip Leverhulme Prize is awarded by the Leverhulme Trust to recognise the achievement of outstanding researchers whose work has already attracted international recognition and whose future career is exceptionally promising. The prize scheme makes up to thirty awards of £100,000 a year, across a range of academic disciplines.

History and criteria 
The award is named after Philip Leverhulme who died in 2000. He was the grandson of William Leverhulme, and was the third Viscount Leverhulme. The prizes are payable, in instalments, over a period of two to three years. Prizes can be used for any purpose which can advance the prize-holder’s research, with the exception of enhancing the prize-holder’s salary. 

Nominees must hold either a permanent post or a long-term fellowship in a UK institution of higher education or research that would extend beyond the duration of the Philip Leverhulme Prize. Those otherwise without salary are not eligible to be nominated. Nominees should normally have been awarded their doctoral degree not more than ten years prior to the closing date.

Awards
Leverhulme awards are granted annually.

2022 
In 2022 the prizes were awarded in the following fields:

 Archaeology: Chiara Bonacchi, Marianne Hem Eriksen, Corisande Fenwick, Patrick Gleeson, Sarah Inskip 
 Chemistry: Bryan Bzdek, Nicholas Chilton, Brianna Heazlewood, Rebecca Melen, Ruth Webster
 Economics: Abi Adams-Prassl, Stefano Caria, Thiemo Fetzer, Sandra Sequeira, Daniel Wilhelm 
 Engineering: Sebastian Bonilla, John Orr, Daniel Slocombe, Harrison Steel, Jin Xuan
 Geography: Maan Barua, Sarah Bell, Anita Ganesan, Ed Manley, Isla Myers-Smith
 Languages and Literatures: Joanna Allan, Josie Gill, Joseph Hone, Preti Taneja, Sam Wolfe

2021 
In 2021 the prizes were awarded in the following fields:

 Classics: Tom Geue, Theodora Jim, Giuseppe Pezzini, Henry Stead, Kathryn Stevens
 Earth Sciences: Nicholas Brantut, Andrea Burke, Paula Koelemeijer, Erin Saupe, Nem Vaughan
 Physics: Jayne Birkby, Radha Boya, Denis Martynov, Jonathan Matthews, Samuel Stranks
 Politics and International Relations: Teresa Bejan, Christopher Claassen, Graham Denyer Willis, Janina Dill, Inken von Borzyskowski
 Psychology: Jennifer Cook, Jim A.C. Everett, Tobias Hauser, Patricia Lockwood, Netta Weinstein
 Visual and Performing Arts: Jennifer Coates, Mohamad Hafeda, Lonán Ó Briain, Martin O'Brien, Annebella Pollen

2020 
In 2020 the prizes were awarded in the following fields:

 Biological Sciences:  Tanmay Bharat,  Hernán Burbano,  Hansong Ma, Daniel Streicker, Edze Westra
 History: Sophie Ambler, Stefan Hanß, Florence Sutcliffe-Braithwaite, Rian Thum, Alexia Yates
 Law: Jeremias Adams-Prassl, Paul Davies, Nadine El-Enany, Emily Grabham, Guido Rossi
 Mathematics and Statistics: Ana Caraiani, Heather Harrington, Richard Montgomery, Nick Sheridan, Sasha Sodin
 Philosophy and Theology: Liam Kofi Bright, Elselijn Kingma, Laura Quick, Emily Thomas, Joseph Webster
 Sociology and Social Policy: Judith Bovensiepen, Emily Dawson, Kayleigh Garthwaite, Nisha Kapoor, Lucy Mayblin

2019 
In 2019 the prizes were awarded in the following fields:

 Archaeology: Kate Britton, Enrico Crema, Jessica Hendy, Jane Kershaw, Ben Russell
 Chemistry: Artem Bakulin, Thomas Bennett, Kim Jelfs, Daniele Leonori, Silvia Vignolini
 Economics: Gabriella Conti, James Fenske, Friederike Mengel, Benjamin Moll
 Engineering: Jessica Boland, Rainer Groh, Hannah Joyce, Camille Petit, Alister Smith
 Geography: Sarah Batterman, Christina Hicks, Robert Hilton, Fiona McConnell, Philippa Williams
 Languages & Literature: Marc Alexander, Emma Bond, Merve Emre, Martin Paul Eve, Joseph Moshenska

2018 
In 2018 the prizes were awarded in the following fields:

 Classics: Amin Benaissa, Myles Lavan, Alex Mullen, Amy Russell, Shaul Tor
 Earth Sciences: Juliet Biggs, Stephen L. Brusatte, Heather Graven, Babette Hoogakker, Amanda Maycock
 Physics: Alis Deason, Simone De Liberato, Katherine Dooley, Rahul Raveendran Nair, John Russo
 Politics and International Relations: Ezequiel Gonzalez Ocantos, Chris Hanretty, Sophie Harman, Lauren Wilcox, Lea Ypi
 Psychology: Emily S Cross, Stephen Fleming, Claire Haworth, Harriet Over, Nichola Raihani
 Visual and Performing Arts: Erika Balsom, Daisy Fancourt, Ian Kiaer, Peter McMurray, Tiffany Watt Smith

2017
In 2017 the prizes were awarded in the following fields:
 Biological Sciences:  Tom Baden, Katie Field, Nick Graham, Kayla King, Andrea Migliano
 History: Andrew Arsan, Toby Green, David Motadel, Lucie Ryzova, Alice Taylor
 Law: Pinar Akman, Ana Aliverti, Fiona de Londras, Rosie Harding, Jeff King
 Mathematics and Statistics: Anders Hansen, Oscar Randal-Williams, Carola-Bibiane Schönlieb, Dominic Vella, Hendrik Weber
 Philosophy and Theology:  Naomi Appleton, Joel Cabrita, John Michael, Ian Phillips, Bryan W Roberts
 Sociology and Social Policy: David Clifford, Des Fitzgerald, Suzanne Hall, Tim Huijts, Alice Mah

2016
In 2016 the prizes were awarded  in the following fields.

 Archaeology: Susana Carvalho, Manuel Fernandez-Gotz, Oliver Harris, Camilla Speller, Fraser Sturt
 Chemistry: John Bower, Scott Cockroft, David Glowacki, Susan Perkin, Aron Walsh
 Economics: Vasco Carvalho, Camille Landais, Kalina Manova, Uta Schönberg, Fabian Waldinger
 Engineering: Anna Barnett, Cinzia Casiraghi, David Connolly, Alexandra Silva, Peter Vincent
 Geography: Katherine Brickell, Vanesa Castán Broto, Mark Graham, Harriet Hawkins, David Thornalley
 Languages and Literatures: William Abberley, Alexandra Harris, Daisy Hay, Lily Okalani Kahn, Hannah Rohde

2015
In 2015 the prizes were awarded  in the following fields.

 Classics: Mirko Canevaro, Esther Eidinow, Renaud Gagné, Naoíse Mac Sweeney, Laura Swift
 Earth sciences: John Rudge, James Screen, Karin Sigloch,  Dominick Spracklen, Nicholas Tosca
 Physics:  Jacopo Bertolotti, Daniele Faccio, Jo Dunkley,  Philip King, Suchitra Sebastian
 Politics: John Bew,  Elena Fiddian-Qasmiyeh, Dominik Hangartner, Laura Valentini, Nick Vaughan-Williams
 Psychology: Caroline Catmur, Bhismadev Chakrabarti,  Steve Loughnan,  Liz Pellicano,  Jonathan Roiser
 Visual arts: Sara Davidmann, Mattias Frey, Hannah Rickards, Martin Suckling, Corin Sworn

2014 
In 2014, thirty-one prizes were awarded. The 2014 subjects and prizewinners were: 
Biological Sciences: Michael Brockhurst, Elizabeth Murchison, Ewa Paluch, Thomas Richards, Nikolay Zenkin
History: Manuel Barcia Paz, Aaron Moore, Renaud Morieux, Hannah Skoda, David Trippett
Mathematics and Statistics: Alexandros Beskos, Daniel Kral, David Loeffler and Sarah Zerbes, Richard Samworth, Corinna Ulcigrai
Philosophy and Theology: Jonathan Birch, Tim Button, Ofra Magidor, Anna Mahtani, Holger Zellentin
Law: Alan Bogg, Prabha Kotiswaran, Sarah Nouwen, Erika Rackley, Michael Waibel
Sociology and Social Policy:  Lucie Cluver, Hazem Kandil, Victoria Redclift, Katherine Smith, Imogen Tyler

2013 
The 2013 subjects were: 
 Astronomy and Astrophysics: Richard Alexander,  Stefan Kraus,  Mathew Owens, Mark Swinbank,  John (Southworth) Taylor
 Economics:  Jane Cooley Fruehwirth
 Engineering: Haider Butt, Bharathram Ganapathisubramani, Eileen Gentleman, Aline Miller, Ferdinando Rodriguez y Baena
 Geography:  Ben Anderson, Dabo Guan, Anna Lora-Wainwright, Erin McClymont, Colin McFarlane,  David Nally, Lindsay Stringer
 Modern languages and Literature:  Kathryn Banks, Andrew Counter, Sally Faulkner,  Lara Feigel,  David James,  James Smith, Hannah Sullivan
 Performing and Visual Arts: Martin John Callanan, Nadia Davids,  James Moran,  Tim Smith

2012 
The 2012 subjects were:
 Classics : Patrick Finglass, Miriam Leonard, Michael Squire, Peter Thonemann, Kostas Vlassopoulos
 Earth, Ocean and Atmospheric Sciences : Matt Friedman, Richard Katz, Kirsty Penkman,  Laura Robinson, Paul Williams
 History of Art : Jo Applin, Matthew Potter, Richard Taws, Tamara Trodd,  Leon Wainwright
 Law : Kimberley Brownlee, James Chalmers, Ioannis Lianos, Marc Moore, Anthea Roberts
 Mathematics and Statistics : Toby Gee, Jonathan Marchini, Andre Neves, Christoph Ortner, Lasse Rempe-Gillen,
 Medieval, Early Modern and Modern History : Duncan Bell, Alexander Morrison, Sadiah Qureshi, Sujit Sivasundaram, David Todd

2011 
The 2011 subjects were: 
 Astronomy and Astrophysics: Emma Bunce, Andrew Levan, Richard Massey, David Pontin, David Seery
 Economics: Michael Elsby, Andrea Galeotti, Sophocles Mavroeidis, Helen Simpson, Paul Surico
 Geography: Peter Adey, Siwan Davies, Hayley Fowler, Simon Lewis, Simon Reid-Henry
 Modern European Languages & Literatures: Anthony Bale, Lindiwe Dovey, Kirsty Hooper, Ben Hutchinson, Robert Macfarlane
 Performing & Visual Arts: Ed Bennett, Helen Freshwater, Esther Johnson, Phoebe Unwin, Emily Wardill

2010 
The 2010 subjects were: 
 Earth, Ocean and Atmospheric Sciences, e.g. Tamsin Mather 
 History of Art 
 Law 
 Mathematics and Statistics: Caucher Birkar
 Medieval, Early Modern and Modern History

2009 
The 2009 subjects were: 
 Astronomy and Astrophysics
 Engineering
 Geography
 Modern European Languages and Literature: Santanu Das
 Performing and Visual Arts

2008 
The 2008 subjects were:
 Earth, Ocean and Atmospheric Sciences: Stephen Barker, Alan Haywood, Heiko Pälike, Paul Palmer, Rosalind Rickaby, Christian Turney
 History of Art: Jill Burke, Natasha Eaton, Alexander Marr, Carol Richardson, Caroline Vout
 Medieval, Early Modern, And Modern History: Filippo de Vivo, Caroline Humfress, Simon MacLean, Hannah Smith, Paul Warde, William Whyte
 Mathematics and Statistics: Martin Hairer, Harald Helfgott, Jared Tanner, Andreas Winter, Marianna Csornyei
 Zoology: William Hughes, Kate E Jones, Andrea Manica, Tommaso Pizzari, Jane Reid

2007 
The 2007 subjects were:
 Astronomy and Astrophysics – David Alexander, Philip Best, Clare Parnell, and William Percival
 Engineering – Leroy Cronin, Jeremy O'Brien
 Geography – Jemma Wadham, Robert John Mayhew
 Modern European Languages and Literature
 Philosophy and Ethics – Hannes Leitgeb, Alison Stone

2006 
The 2006 subjects were:
 Earth, Ocean and Atmospheric Sciences: Lucy Carpenter
 History of Art
 Medieval, Early Modern and Modern History
 Mathematics and Statistics: Matt Keeling
 Zoology

2005 
The 2005 subjects were:
 Astronomy and Astrophysics: Katherine Blundell, Sheila Rowan, Stephen Smartt
 Engineering: Clemens Kaminski, Andrea C. Ferrari 
 Geography: Klaus Dodds, Sarah Holloway, Kevin Ward, Martin R Jones, Georgina H Endfield, Rachel Pain
 Modern European Languages and Literature
 Philosophy and Ethics: Tim Lewens

2004 
The 2004 subjects were:
 Anthropology
 Earth, Ocean and Atmospheric Sciences
 Economics
 Mathematics and Statistics
 Medieval, Early Modern and Modern History

2003 
The 2003 subjects were:
 Astronomy and Astrophysics : Louise Harra
 Classics
 Engineering
 Geography
 Philosophy and Ethics

2002 
The 2002 subjects were:
 Software Technology for Information and Communications Technology
 Ocean, Earth and Atmospheric Sciences
 Modern History since 1800
 Economics
 Biochemistry and Molecular Biology

2001 
The 2001 subjects were:
 Astronomy and Astrophysics
 Classics
 Engineering
 Geography
 Philosophy and Ethics

References

Academic awards
British science and technology awards
Charities based in London
Early career awards
2000 establishments in the United Kingdom
Foundations based in the United Kingdom
Funding bodies in the United Kingdom
Science and technology in the United Kingdom